This list includes commanders of the Turkish Land Forces, who were, in their time of service, nominal heads of the Turkish Land Forces (or Turkish Army).

The current Commander of the Turkish Land Forces is General Musa Avsever, since 13 August 2021.

See also 
 Chief of the Turkish General Staff
 List of commanders of the Turkish Air Force
 List of commanders of the Turkish Naval Forces
 List of general commanders of the Turkish Gendarmerie
 List of commandants of the Turkish Coast Guard
 List of commanders of the First Army of Turkey
 List of commanders of the Second Army of Turkey
 List of commanders of the Third Army of Turkey
 List of commanders of the Aegean Army

References

Sources 
 Harp Akademileri Komutanlığı, Harp Akademilerinin 120 Yılı, İstanbul, 1968. 

Army
Turkey